Senator Porter may refer to:

Members of the United States Senate
Alexander Porter (1785–1844), U.S. Senator from Louisiana from 1833 to 1837
Augustus Seymour Porter (1798–1872), U.S. Senator from Michigan from 1840 to 1845

United States state senate members
Claude R. Porter (1872–1946), Iowa State Senate
David R. Porter (1788–1867), Pennsylvania State Senate
E. Melvin Porter (1930–2016), Oklahoma State Senate
Edward F. Porter (1858–1915), North Dakota State Senate
Foster B. Porter (1891–1965), Wisconsin State Senate
John Porter (New York politician) (1790–1874), New York State Senate
John Porter (Pennsylvania politician), Pennsylvania State Senate
Jon Porter (born 1955), Nevada State Senate
King G. Porter (1921–2012), Tennessee State Senate
Thomas F. Porter (1847–1927), Massachusetts State Senate
Timothy H. Porter (1785–1845), New York State Senate

See also
John Porter-Porter (1855–1939), Northern Irish Senate